The Concise Oxford English Dictionary (officially titled The Concise Oxford Dictionary until 2002, and widely abbreviated COD or COED) is probably the best-known of the 'smaller' Oxford dictionaries. The latest edition contains over 240,000 entries and 1,728 pages ("concise" compared to the OED at over 21,000 pages). Its 12th edition, published in 2011, is used by both the United Nations (UN) and NATO as the current authority for spellings in documents in English for international use. It is available as an e-book for a variety of handheld device platforms. In addition to providing information for general use, it documents local variations such as United States and United Kingdom usage.

It was started as a derivative of the Oxford English Dictionary (OED), although section S–Z had to be written before the Oxford English Dictionary reached that stage. However, starting from the 10th edition, it is based on the Oxford Dictionary of English (ODE) rather than the OED. The most recent edition is the 12th, published in 2011.

Publications

English dictionaries

The Concise Oxford Dictionary of Current English
 1st Edition (1911): The Concise Oxford Dictionary of Current English, adapted by H. W. Fowler and F. G. Fowler ... from the Oxford Dictionary. (They wrote the last section S–Z before the Oxford English Dictionary had reached that stage.)
 2nd Edition (1929): The Concise Oxford Dictionary of Current English H. W. Fowler alone (his brother had died in 1918, although his name is still on the title page).
 3rd Edition: (1934) was revised by H. W. Fowler and H. G. Le Mesurier.
 4th (1951) and 5th (1964) Editions were revised by E. McIntosh, who introduced the space-saving swung dash that stands for the headword. The title page still read The Concise Oxford Dictionary of Current English; but the description read 'edited by H. W. Fowler and F. G. Fowler; based on The Oxford Dictionary'.
 6th (1976) and 7th (1982) Editions were still called The Concise Oxford Dictionary of Current English, but the subtitle now read based on the Oxford English dictionary and its supplements first edited by H.W. Fowler and F.G. Fowler. It was (thoroughly) edited by J.B. Sykes, catching up with the developments in the parent dictionary. In the 7th Edition, symbols were introduced to mark uses considered controversial or offensive.
 8th Edition (1990): The Concise Oxford Dictionary of Current English, first edited by H. W. Fowler and F. G. Fowler was edited by Robert E. Allen. Being computer-based, this edition changed the original structure to a large extent.
 9th Edition (1995) was edited by Della Thompson.
 1st Edition 100th Anniversary Edition (2011): The Concise Oxford Dictionary The 1911 First Edition includes the photocopied version of the 1st Edition dictionary, an introductory essay by renowned language expert David Crystal, a timeline of the chronology through 100 years of COED.
 (hardcover)
1st impression (2011-07-07)

The Concise Oxford English Dictionary
 10th Edition (1999, revised 2001) became The Concise Oxford English Dictionary. It was edited by Judy Pearsall. Rather than being a direct revision of the 9th edition, it was based on the larger New Oxford Dictionary of English (1998), which Pearsall had edited. Its compilation had involved a re-analysis of much of the core vocabulary using the British National Corpus. The 10th edition was also issued as an electronic resource, as a computer optical disc.
This edition was to be the last Concise Oxford Dictionary to be used on Countdown, as contestant Helen Wrigglesworth declared ROADSIDE and it was declared illegal. After further inspection from Mark Nyman, the dictionary was found to not have any compound words in it, and was thus abandoned and the show reverted to the 9th edition. The show switched to New Oxford Dictionary of English in series 43.

Concise Oxford English Dictionary
 11th Edition (2004, revised 2006, 2008 and 2009), the Concise Oxford English Dictionary was edited by Catherine Soanes and Angus Stevenson. It was based on the Oxford Dictionary of English (2nd edition (2003), which Soanes and Stevenson had edited). The 11th Edition is available on CD-ROM as an e-book for a variety of platforms.
 12th Edition (2011), the Concise Oxford English Dictionary was edited by Angus Stevenson and Maurice Waite. This edition included 400 new entries, including sexting, cyberbullying, gastric band, jeggings, retweet, and woot. Includes 240,000 words, phrases, and definitions; with vocabulary covering technical and scientific vocabulary and international English. CD-ROM includes 50,000 spoken audio pronunciations, and supports Windows 2000 and above, Mac OS X 10.1 and above.
1st impression (2011-08-18)
 (book and CD-ROM combination)
?th impression (2011-09-02)
Android version: published by MobiSystems, Inc. Supports Android 4.1. Supports 18 language (Catalan, Danish, Dutch, Finnish, French, German, Hungarian, Italian, Latin, Norwegian, Polish, Portuguese, Romanian, Spanish, Swedish, Tagalog, Turkish and English) since version 6.0.
5.1.020 (redesigned user interface and experience. Adds word definitions sharing, Word of the Day, camera search)
6.0.009 (2016-09-29)
iOS version: published by MobiSystems, Inc. Supports iOS 8.0. Includes English and Catalan languages.
8.2.5 (2016-09-20): Adds iOS 10 optimizations.

Concise Oxford American Dictionary
Contents are derived from New Oxford American Dictionary.
1st edition: Dictionary includes over 180,000 entries and definitions, over 300 illustrations.
/
?th impression (2006-05-18)
Android version. Published by MobiSystems.
4.3.136 (Android 2.2 version, full version?)
5.1.020
6.0.009 (2016-09-29) (Android 4.1 version, 30-day trial)
iOS. Published by MobiSystems.
8.2.5 (2016-09-21) (iOS 10 support, full version)
Windows version. Published by MobiSystems.
2.2 (2015-05-27) (7-day trial)

Concise Oxford American Thesaurus
?th edition: Includes over 12,000 main entries and over 350,000 synonyms.

?th impression (2006-04-20)
Android version. Published by MobiSystems.
5.2.003
6.0.009 (2016-09-29) (Android 4.1 version, 30-day trial)
iOS. Published by MobiSystems.
8.2.2 (2016-09-01) (iOS 8 (iOS 10 support), full version)
Windows version. Published by MobiSystems.
2.2 (2015-05-27) (7-day trial)
browser version. Published by MobiSystems.
2.1.0.4 (2015-04-09) (full version)

Concise Oxford American Dictionary and Thesaurus
It is a compilation of both Concise Oxford American Dictionary and Concise Oxford American Thesaurus.
?th edition: Dictionary includes over 180,000 entries and definitions; Thesaurus includes over 12,000 main entries and over 350,000 synonyms.
Android 2.2 version sold by Amazon Digital Services LLC. Published by MobiSystems.
ASIN B00ID7LNC6
? (2014-02-12) (initial version)
4.3.122 (2015-08-24) (Android 2.2 version, full version?)
iOS version. Published by MobiSystems.
8.2.2 (2016-09-01/2016-09-02) (iOS 8, Full Version)
Windows version. Published by MobiSystems.
2.2 (2015-03-24) (Windows 8.1–10, 7-day trial)
2.2.0.7 (2015?)
browser version. Published by MobiSystems.
2.1.0.4 (2015-04-06) (full version)
?th edition: Dictionary includes over 240,000 entries and definitions; Thesaurus includes over 300,000 synonyms and antonyms.
Android version. Published by MobiSystems.
5.1.030
6.0.009 (2016-09-29) (Android 4.1 version, 30-day trial)

Australian Concise Oxford Dictionary
Australian Concise Oxford Dictionary contains entries from contemporary Australian and international English. Edited by Dr Bruce Moore, it incorporates entries from Oxford English Dictionary, Concise Oxford Dictionary, and the Australian National Dictionary.
5th edition
?th impression (2009-??-??)
?th impression (2011-06-18)

Oxford South African Concise Dictionary
2nd Edition: Includes over 200,000 main entries with 2,000 South African words.

?th impression (2011-01-27)

English-Arabic dictionaries

Concise Oxford English-Arabic Dictionary of Current Usage
?th edition: Edited by N. S. Doniach. Dictionary includes around 40,000 entries.
/
?th impression (1983-02-03)

English-Chinese dictionaries

Concise Oxford English-Chinese Dictionary
Concise Oxford English-Chinese Dictionary (牛津現代英漢雙解大詞典/牛津现代英汉双解大词典) is published by Foreign Language Teaching and Research Press in China. Online version became available in 2011.
Extended Edition (牛津现代英汉双解词典增补版): Includes 130,000 headwords, about 1000 usage examples.
?th impression (2005-01-01)
 12th edition (牛津現代英漢雙解大詞典 第12版): Includes 240,000 headwords, phrases, and explanations.
1st impression (2013-05-01)

Warmth Concise Oxford English-Chinese Dictionary
Warmth Concise Oxford English-Chinese Dictionary (牛津現代簡明英漢雙解辭典) is published by warmth Co/Warmth Publishing Group in Taiwan.
? edition (/): Edited by Lai Shixiong from Guangxi, China. Includes 120,000 headwords, phrases (3500 more vocabularies over previous version), and 140,000 explanations.
?th impression (2009-02-10)
?th impression (2009-02-26)

Oxford Concise English-Chinese Chinese-English Dictionary
It is a two-way dictionary. Chinese translations are in simplified Chinese, with traditional Chinese used in comments. Chinese pronunciation is in Mandarin.
3rd (精選英漢漢英詞典第三版):
/ (Oxford University Press (China) Ltd. version, paperback)
?th impression (2004-02-11)
4th Edition (牛津精選英漢•漢英詞典第4版): Includes 90,000 entries and 130,000 translations.
 (Oxford University Press (China) Ltd. version, paperback)
 (Oxford University Press (China) Ltd. version, compact softback)

Concise English-Chinese Chinese-English Dictionary
It is a version of Oxford Concise English-Chinese Chinese-English Dictionary published by The Commercial Press. Publication deal between Oxford University Press and The Commercial Press was approved in 1983.
1st edition:
1st impression (1986-06-??)
? Edition:
/ (精选英汉汉英词典)
?th impression (1994-07-28)
3rd Edition: 47 impressions.
//H.983 (精选英汉汉英词典第三版): 43 impressions.
?th impression (2004-10-01)
 (精选英汉汉英词典(大字本)第三版) (large print)
?th impression (2005-05-01)
4th Edition: Includes 90,000 entries and 130,000 translations.
 (精选英汉汉英词典第4版) (paperback)
?th impression (2010-09-01)
 (精选英汉汉英词典(大字本)第4版) (large print, paperback)
?th impression (2011-11-01)

English-French dictionaries

Concise Oxford-Hachette French Dictionary
4th edition: Includes over 175,000 words and phrases, and 270,000 translations.

?th impression (2006-04-20)
Android version. Published by MobiSystems.
5.2.003
6.0.009 (2016-09-29) (Android 4.1 version, 30-day trial)
iOS. Published by MobiSystems.
8.2.2 (2016-09-01) (iOS 8 (iOS 10 support), full version)
Windows version. Published by MobiSystems.
2.2 (2015-03-24) (7-day trial)
browser version. Published by MobiSystems.
2.1.0.4 (2015-04-07) (full version)

English-German dictionaries
English-German dictionaries are two-way dictionaries published in association with Duden.

The Concise Oxford-Duden German Dictionary
1st edition (ASIN B01JXP5WGE): Includes over 140,000 words and phrases, and 240,000 translations.
1st? impression (1992-11-12)
Revised Edition (/): Includes over 140,000 words and phrases, and 240,000 translations.
1st? impression (1997-09-??/1997-11-20)

Pop-up Concise Oxford-Duden German Dictionary
It is an electronic version of Concise Oxford-Duden German Dictionary.
1st? edition (/): Includes over 150,000 words and phrases, 250,000 translations. Supports Windows 95. iFinger Pop-up supports Internet Explorer.
1st? impression (2001-07-15)

Concise Oxford Duden German Dictionary
2nd edition (ASIN B01HCASUH0)
1st? impression (1998-09-17)
2nd edition: Based on Oxford-Duden German Dictionary 2nd edition. Includes 140,000 words and phrases, and over 240,000 translations.
new cover edition (/)
?th impression (2000-09-07)
UK book+CD-ROM edition (/)
1st? impression (2001-09-06)
3rd edition: Based on Oxford-Duden German Dictionary 3rd edition. Includes 150,000 words and phrases, and over 250,000 translations.
Hardcover version (/)
1st? impression (2005-07-21)
Windows CD-ROM version (Concise Oxford Duden German Dictionary MSDict Electronic Version) (/): Published by Mobile Systems. Supports Windows XP.
1st? impression (2007-06-??)

Concise Oxford German Dictionary
3rd edition (/): Includes 150,000 words and phrases, and 250,000 translations.
1st? impression (2010-02-08)

English-Italian dictionaries

Concise Oxford Paravia Italian Dictionary
It is a two-way dictionary.
?th edition: Includes over 175,000 words and phrases, and 290,000 translations.
/ (hardcover, includes 12 months access to Oxford Language Dictionaries Online)
?thClarification}} impression (2000-09-07)
Android version. Published by MobiSystems.
6.0.009 (2016-09-29) (30-day trial)
iOS version. Published by MobiSystems.
8.2.2 (2016-09-12) (Full Version)
Windows version. Published by MobiSystems.
2.2 (2015-03-20) (7-day trial)
browser version. Published by MobiSystems.
2.1.0.4 (2015-04-06) (full version)

English-Spanish dictionaries

Concise Oxford Spanish Dictionary
It is a two-way dictionary.
4th edition: Includes over 175,000 words and phrases, and 240,000 translations. Also includes new words and phrases based on findings from Oxford's English and Spanish language Reading Programmes

?th impression (2009-06-04)

See also
 Compact Oxford English Dictionary of Current English – a smaller one-volume Oxford dictionary
 Shorter Oxford English Dictionary – a larger two-volume Oxford dictionary

Notes and references

Further reading
 Małgorzata Anna Kamińska, A history of the Concise Oxford Dictionary, Frankfurt am Main, Peter Lang Publishing Group, 2014.

External links
Oxford University Press page: COED 12th edition, COED 12th edition Book & CD-ROM Set,  TCOD 1st Edition 100th Anniversary Edition, Australian Concise Oxford Dictionary 5th Edition, Concise Oxford American Dictionary 1st edition, Concise Oxford American Thesaurus, Oxford South African Concise Dictionary, Concise Oxford Spanish Dictionary 4th edition, Concise Oxford English-Arabic Dictionary of Current Usage
Foreign Language Teaching and Research Press page: COECD 12th edition, Oxford·Fltrp English-Chinese Chinese-English Dictionary,  Oxford·Fltrp English-Chinese Chinese-English Dictionary (compact edition)
warmth Co page: Warmth Concise Oxford English-Chinese Dictionary
Android page: Concise Oxford English
iTunes page: Concise Oxford English Dictionary with Audio
Mobisystems pages: Concise Oxford English Dictionary and Thesaurus, Concise Oxford English Dictionary with Audio, Concise Oxford-Hachette French Dictionary, Concise Oxford-Paravia Italian Dictionary, Concise Oxford American Dictionary, Concise Oxford American Thesaurus, Concise Oxford American Dictionary and Thesaurus
Amazon USA information
Amazon UK information

2011 non-fiction books
Oxford dictionaries
English dictionaries
Works derived from the Oxford English Dictionary